Madenler is a village in the Evciler District, Afyonkarahisar Province, Turkey. Its population is 498 (2021).

References

Villages in Evciler District